is a Japanese voice actress from Osaka Prefecture who is affiliated with Ken Production. She is known for her roles as Himeko Mashima in the Show By Rock!! franchise, Sasha Necron in The Misfit of Demon King Academy, Yuyu Shirai in Assault Lily Bouquet, and Tsubaki in In the Heart of Kunoichi Tsubaki.

Biography
Natsuyoshi's voice acting activities began after she won an audition held by the talent agency Ken Production in 2016. After two years of training under Ken Production's voice acting school, she formally became affiliated with them in 2018. She played her first role as a mob character in the anime television series Grand Blue, before being cast in her first main role as Himeko Mashima in the Show By Rock!! franchise.

In 2019, Natsuyoshi voiced Vivian in Journal of the Mysterious Creatures. In 2020, she was cast as Yamada in My Roomie Is a Dino, Sasha Necron in The Misfit of Demon King Academy, and as Yuyu Shirai in Assault Lily Bouquet.

Filmography

Anime
2018
Grand Blue, Tinkerbell member C (episode 7)

2019
Karakuri Circus, Rocket Announcement, Alpha
Phantasy Star Online 2: Episode Oracle, Operator
My Hero Academia as Female citizen (episode 68), Female student (episode 72)

2020
Chihayafuru 3, Recorder, girl, Fujisaki girl student
Show by Rock!! Mashumairesh!!, Himeko Mashima
Pokémon Journeys: The Series, Koharu's homeroom teacher, boy
My Roomie Is a Dino, Yamada
Motto! Majime ni Fumajime Kaiketsu Zorori, Staff, wife, Polyrin
Journal of the Mysterious Creatures, Vivian
The Misfit of Demon King Academy, Sasha Necron
Assault Lily Bouquet, Yuyu Shirai
Higurashi: When They Cry – Gou, Waitress
Cardfight!! Vanguard Gaiden if, Staff A

2021
Show by Rock!! Stars!!, Himeko Mashima
I've Been Killing Slimes for 300 Years and Maxed Out My Level, Monk
To Your Eternity, Village woman, handmaiden, Chan's brother, Mia
Tsukimichi: Moonlit Fantasy, Reception
Assault Lily Fruits, Yuyu Shirai
Mieruko-chan, Female friend A

2022
She Professed Herself Pupil of the Wise Man, Emera
Kotaro Lives Alone, Convenience Store Cashier, Woman (episode 2), Boy (episode 5)
In the Heart of Kunoichi Tsubaki, Tsubaki
Don't Hurt Me, My Healer!, Medusa
Shine Post, Rio Seibu

2023
The Misfit of Demon King Academy 2nd Season, Sasha Necron

Video games
2019
The Legend of Zelda: Link's Awakening, Marin
Pokémon Masters, Whitney
Touhou Cannonball, Minamitsu Murasa

2020
Last Period, Furau
Magia Record, Meguru Hibiki
Show By Rock!! Fes A Live, Himeko Mashima
Sakura Kakumei: Hanasaku Otome-tachi, Asebi Mikohama

2021
Assault Lily Last Bullet, Yuyu Shirai
A Certain Magical Index: Imaginary Fest, Ayame Fusō

2022
Azur Lane, Alfredo Oriani
Blue Archive, Kazusa Kyōyama

2023
Uma Musume: Pretty Derby, Cheval Grand

References

External links
Agency profile 

Japanese video game actresses
Japanese voice actresses
Ken Production voice actors
Voice actresses from Osaka Prefecture
Living people
21st-century Japanese actresses
Year of birth missing (living people)